MS  Grigoriy Ordzhonikidze was an ocean liner owned by the Soviet Union's Far East Shipping Company named after Georgian Bolshevik and later member of the CPSU Politburo Grigory Ordzhonikidze. . She was built in 1959 by VEB Mathias-Thesen Werft, Wismar, East Germany. She was scrapped in 1992 in Alang, India.

See also
 List of cruise ships

References

External links

The Soviet Fleet 

Cruise ships
Ships built in East Germany
Passenger ships of the Soviet Union
East Germany–Soviet Union relations
1958 ships
Ships built in Wismar